Qu Leilei (曲磊磊, born 1951) is a contemporary Chinese artist currently based in the UK.

Qu grew up in China during the Cultural Revolution and spent some time forced in to hard labour as his parents were branded capitalists . Later, he served as an art director at China Central Television.

In 1979, as one of the founding members of the avant-garde "Stars Group", together with, Wang Keping, Ma De Sheng, Mao Lizi, Huang Rui, Li Shuang, Ah Cheng and Ai Weiwei, Qu took part in the first exhibitions of contemporary art in China.

After Qu left China, he relocated to London to practice his art, lecture and exhibit internationally. His paintings were exhibited at a solo display in the Ashmolean Museum at Oxford in 2005, the first time in the Ashmolean that a show was devoted singly to the work of a living artist. He has also had a solo exhibition at Beijings National Gallery and his works have been exhibited and collected worldwide and by museums including the British Museum and the V&A in London. His work at the British museum is now part of their permanent collection and this was marked with a symposium about himself and the Stars movement and his work.

Also in 2005, he was one of three finalists for the Arts Council England "Pearl Award for Creative Excellence".

References

Further reading

External links
Profile at Art for Humanity

People's Republic of China calligraphers
People's Republic of China painters
20th-century British painters
British male painters
21st-century British painters
Chinese emigrants to England
Living people
1951 births
British calligraphers
Chinese contemporary artists
20th-century British male artists
21st-century British male artists